John Richard Cenci (born January 4, 1934) is a former American football player who played for Pittsburgh Steelers of the National Football League (NFL). He played college football at the University of Pittsburgh.

References

1934 births
Living people
American football centers
Players of American football from Pittsburgh
Pittsburgh Panthers football players
Pittsburgh Steelers players